René Klingbeil (born 2 April 1981) is a German retired footballer who is an assistant coach of Carl Zeiss Jena.

His first senior club was Borussia Mönchengladbach. He then went on to Hamburger SV. In 2007, he joined Viking FK in Norway. He was released in the summer of 2008 and was offered a contract by Dynamo Dresden but declined their first offer.

Honours
Hamburger SV
UEFA Intertoto Cup: 2005

References

External links

1981 births
Living people
German footballers
Borussia Mönchengladbach players
Borussia Mönchengladbach II players
Hamburger SV players
Hamburger SV II players
Viking FK players
FC Erzgebirge Aue players
Expatriate footballers in Norway
Eliteserien players
Bundesliga players
2. Bundesliga players
3. Liga players
Regionalliga players
German expatriate footballers
German expatriate sportspeople in Norway
Footballers from Berlin
Association football defenders
German football managers
3. Liga managers
FC Carl Zeiss Jena managers